Amador Campos Aburto (born 25 May 1951) is a Mexican politician affiliated with the Party of the Democratic Revolution. He served as Deputy of the LX Legislature of the Mexican Congress representing Guerrero, and previously served as municipal president of Zihuatanejo from 2002 to 2005. After his term in Congress, he served as a local deputy in the LX Legislature of the Congress of Guerrero.

References

1951 births
Living people
Politicians from Guerrero
Party of the Democratic Revolution politicians
21st-century Mexican politicians
Deputies of the LX Legislature of Mexico
Members of the Chamber of Deputies (Mexico) for Guerrero
Municipal presidents in Guerrero
Members of the Congress of Guerrero